90 Day Jane was a blog and hoax run by an anonymous woman, known as Jane, who promised to commit suicide 90 days after launching the blog, with the tagline, "I'm Going to Kill Myself in 90 Days". Her blog posts chronicled her life in the days leading up to her ostensibly planned suicide and asked its readers to help her pick a method for killing herself, citing Christine Chubbuck and R. Budd Dwyer as inspirations for her publicizing her suicide. The comments on the blog ranged from sympathetic to negative, with NPR's Laura Conaway writing that "some of them [are] showing the worst -- really, the worst -- in human beings." Suicide prevention advocates frowned upon 90 Day Jane, fearing that it would encourage others to emulate her behavior. In February 2008, she revealed that the blog was started as an art project meant for a small group of her friends and that she did not actually plan on committing suicide; she took down the blog soon after.

References

2008 hoaxes
Blogs
Suicide and the Internet
Living people
Year of birth missing (living people)